The 1992 United States Senate elections, held November 3, 1992, were elections for the United States Senate. The 34 seats of Class 3 were contested in regular elections, along with special elections to fill vacancies. They coincided with Bill Clinton's victory in the presidential election. Both parties swapped a pair of seats, resulting in no net change in partisan breakdown.

Democratic victories over Republicans John F. Seymour (in the special California race) and Bob Kasten (of Wisconsin) were cancelled out by the defeats of Democrats Wyche Fowler (of Georgia) and Terry Sanford (of North Carolina). The election of four new Democratic women to the Senate was notable (referred to in the press as the "Year of the Woman").  Due to a special election in California, both of California's Senate seats were up for election in 1992.  These seats were won by Dianne Feinstein and Barbara Boxer. Thus, California became the first state to have elected women to occupy both of its Senate seats. Democrat Carol Moseley Braun (of Illinois), became the first African-American woman in the United States Senate.

, this was the last election cycle in which Republicans won a Senate election in New York and Democrats in Kentucky.

Results summary

Seat totals include both the special elections in California and North Dakota, but vote totals exclude the North Dakota total.

Source: Office of the Clerk of the U.S. House of Representatives

Gains and losses

Retirements
Three Republicans and four Democrats retired instead of seeking re-election. One Democrat also retired instead of finishing the unexpired term.

Defeats
One Republican and three Democrats sought re-election but lost either in the primary or general election. One Republican also sought election to finish the term but lost in the special election.

Change in composition

Before the elections

Result of the elections

Race summary

Special elections 
In these special elections, the winners were elected and seated in the fall of 1992. Elections are sorted by election date then state and class.

Elections leading to the next Congress 
In these general elections, the winners were elected for the term beginning January 3, 1993; ordered by state.

All of the elections involved the Class 3 seats.

Closest races 

In thirteen races, the margin of victory was under 10%.

Illinois was the tipping point state, decided by a margin of 10%.

Alabama 

Incumbent Democrat Richard Shelby won re-election to a second term, beating Richard Sellers, conservative activist.

Alaska 

Incumbent Republican Frank Murkowski sought re-election to a third term in the United States Senate. Tony Smith, the Democratic nominee and a former Commissioner of Economic Development, won his party's nomination in a crowded primary and faced off against Murkowski in the general election. Though Murkowski was held to a lower vote percentage than he received six years prior, he was ultimately re-elected.

Arizona 

Incumbent Republican John McCain won re-election to a second term over Democrat Claire Sargent, community activist and Independent former Governor Evan Mecham.

Arkansas 

Incumbent Democratic senator Dale Bumpers won re-election to a fourth term. His Republican opponent was future Arkansas lieutenant governor, governor, and two-time presidential candidate Mike Huckabee, a church pastor from Texarkana.

The 1992 election coincided with Arkansas governor Bill Clinton's election as President of the United States, in which he also won his home state. In contrast with Bumpers' landslide where he won over 60% of the vote, Clinton won only 53% of the vote. Bumpers would serve another term in the U.S. Senate before deciding to retire in 1998.

California 

Due to the resignation of Pete Wilson to become Governor of California, there were two senate elections in California as both seats were up for election and both won by women. California ultimately become the first state to have two sitting women senators.

California (regular) 

Incumbent Democrat Alan Cranston decided to retire. Democratic U.S. Congresswoman Barbara Boxer won the open seat over Republican conservative TV talk show commentator Bruce Herschensohn. Both of California's senators were elected for the first time. This is not a unique occurrence; it would happen again in Tennessee in 1994, Kansas in 1996 and Georgia in 2020-2021. Fellow Democrat Dianne Feinstein, California's other senator, won the special election and was inaugurated in November 1992.

The election between Boxer and Herschensohn was very close. At the eleventh hour, controversy emerged that the Republican nominee attended a strip club, which some Republican operatives later blamed for Herschensohn's loss.

Four days before Election Day polls showed Herschensohn had narrowed a double digit deficit, trailing by 3 points. Political operative Bob Mulholland disrupted a campaign appearance with a large poster advertising a strip club shouting "Should the voters of California elect someone who frequently travels the strip joints of Hollywood?" Herschensohn admitted he had visited a strip club once, with his girlfriend and another couple. With press coverage of the story, Herschensohn spent the waning days of the campaign denying related allegations. When the votes were cast and counted, Barbara Boxer won the election by five points. Although Republicans have blamed the defeat on the underhanded tactics of the Boxer campaign, evidence of the connection between Mulholland's outburst and the campaign never surfaced.

The election was very close. Boxer was declared the winner by the Associated Press at 1:22 A.M. Pacific Coast Time.

California (special) 

In the 1990 gubernatorial election, Republican senator Pete Wilson had beaten Democrat Dianne Feinstein for governor. He appointed John F. Seymour to the Senate to replace himself. In this special election held simultaneously with the regular Senate election, Feinstein defeated Seymour to serve the remaining 2 years of the term and took office November 10, only 7 days after the election. Fellow Democrat Barbara Boxer won the regular election and was Swon in January 1993.

Both of California's senators were elected for the first time. This is not a unique occurrence; it would happen again in Tennessee in 1994, Kansas in 1996, and Georgia in 2020.

Colorado 

Incumbent Democrat Tim Wirth decided to retire instead of seeking a second term. Democratic congressman Ben Nighthorse Campbell won the open seat, beating Republican State senator Terry Considine.

Connecticut 

Incumbent Democrat Christopher Dodd won re-election for a third term over Republican businessman Brook Johnson.

Johnson, a millionaire businessman who had never run for public office before, spent about $900,000 during the primary campaign. His television and radio commercials said that he would bring "a dose of success Washington needs." Dodd had $2 million cash on hand following the primaries.

Florida 

Incumbent Democrat Bob Graham won re-election to a second term, beating Republican former U.S. Representative Bill Grant.

Graham defeated Grant in a landslide, as Grant won just one county in the state (Okaloosa County, Florida). There were no third party or independent candidates.

Georgia 

Incumbent Democrat Wyche Fowler did not receive a simple majority in the general election, which demanded a runoff. Paul Coverdell, former Director of the Peace Corps and former State senator, edged out Fowler in the runoff with a narrow margin.

The general primary was held July 21, 1992.  A run-off between the top two Republican contenders was held on August 11, in which Paul Coverdell defeated Bob Barr.

Results for the first round showed that since Paul Coverdell did not win a majority of the vote, a runoff was held between him and Barr. Coverdell subsequently won the runoff.

As no candidate reached a majority on November 3, a runoff election was held on November 24, which Coverdell won.

Hawaii 

Incumbent Democrat Daniel Inouye won re-election to a sixth term over Republican State senator Rick Reed.

Idaho 

Incumbent Republican Steve Symms decided to retire instead of seeking a third term. Republican Mayor of Boise Dirk Kempthorne won the open seat, beating Democratic congressman Richard H. Stallings.

Illinois 

Incumbent Democrat Alan J. Dixon decided to run for re-election a third term, but was defeated in the primary against Carol Moseley Braun, Cook County Recorder of Deeds and former State Representative, who then won the general election over Republican Richard S. Williamson, former Assistant Secretary of State for International Organization Affairs. Braun (whose victory coincided with Bill Clinton's win in the presidential election and Illinois) made history in this election by becoming the first African-American woman ever elected to the U.S Senate, and also the first African-American elected to the U.S Senate as a Democrat.

This defeat shocked observers; at the time no senator had been defeated in a primary in over a decade and Dixon had a long record of electoral success. He was a moderate Democrat, who recently voted to confirm Clarence Thomas to the Supreme Court. Braun, a black woman and known reformist liberal, got a large share of black, liberal, and women voters ("The Year of the Woman").

In addition, she carried Cook County, Illinois, by far the most populated county in the state. Another factor was the third candidate in the race, multi-millionaire attorney Al Hofeld. Hofeld drew away some of the moderate and conservative Democrats who normally supported Dixon. He also spent a lot of money running advertisements attacking Dixon, weakening his support.

Moseley Braun won the 1992 Illinois Senate Race by a fairly comfortable margin. Moseley Braun did well as expected in Cook County home of Chicago. Williamson did well in the Chicago collar counties, and most northern parts of the state. Moseley Braun had a surprisingly strong showing in southern Illinois, which Republicans had come to dominate in the last several decades. Braun also did well in Rock Island County.

Indiana 

Incumbent Republican Dan Coats won re-election to his first full term, beating the Democratic Indiana Secretary of State Joe Hogsett.

When incumbent Republican Dan Quayle resigned from the Senate after being elected Vice President of the United States in 1988, Coats was appointed to Quayle's former seat. He then won re-election to serve the remainder of the term in 1990.

Coats won 79 of Indiana's counties compared to 13 for Hogsett.

Iowa 

Incumbent Republican Chuck Grassley ran for re-election to a third term in the United States Senate, which he won easily against his Democratic opponent, State senator Jean Hall Lloyd-Jones.

Kansas 

Incumbent Republican senator Bob Dole won re-election to a fifth term, defeating Democratic nominee Gloria O'Dell, teacher and former journalist. Nearly two decades after his failed vice-presidential bid in 1976, this would be Dole's last election to the Senate. He would resign in 1996 while running for President of the United States. Dole also became the Republican Leader of the United States Senate seven years prior.

Kentucky 

Incumbent Democratic U.S senator Wendell Ford won re-election to a fourth term, easily beating Republican State senator David L. Williams. , this was the last Senate election in Kentucky in which a Democrat won.

Denny Ormerod, a machinist from Louisville dropped out before the primary election. Though Williams and Thompson represented opposing factions in the state Republican Party – Williams managed Larry Hopkins' 1991 primary campaign while Thompson worked full-time for Hopkins' primary opponent Larry Forgy – the two virtually ignored each other in the primary campaign, choosing instead to focus their rhetoric against Ford. Thompson did question Williams' conservative credentials on grounds that he voted in favor of the tax increase associated with the Kentucky Education Reform Act. Ormerod's campaign largely focused on socially conservative issues, but it was Williams who secured the endorsement of Kentucky Right to Life, who cited his lawsuit to free three anti-abortion bills from committee in the 1992 legislative session. As a result of the largely uninspiring primary campaigns, there was only an 18% voter turnout in the Republican primary. Williams won the nomination.

Ford, the Senate Majority Whip and a former governor, raised $2.4 million for his campaign, about eight times the amount Williams raised. Given his limited finances, Williams relied on news conferences and interviews on small town radio stations to get his message out. Williams repeatedly lamented that Ford would not agree to a formal debate; Ford said that could not be arranged because Congress was still in session and he needed to be in Washington. During the campaign, Williams attempted to paint Ford as too liberal for Kentucky voters, citing his votes against the Gulf War and Clarence Thomas' confirmation to the U.S. Supreme Court. Both candidates declared their support for a Balanced Budget Amendment, but Williams said that Ford's support of pork barrel projects for the state and a procedural vote that kept the amendment from a vote in 1991 were evidence that Ford's support was not genuine.

Ford had no trouble winning on election night. Ford won easily, despite the fact that fellow Democrat Bill Clinton was not declared the winner of the presidential race in Kentucky until around 10:00 E.S.T. Ford pulled big margins out of the majority of Kentucky's 124 counties. This would be Ford's last term in the senate. He served his final term from January 3, 1993, to January 3, 1999. Ford died some fifteen years after his retirement at the age of 90.

Louisiana 

Incumbent Democrat John Breaux won a majority in Louisiana's jungle primary on October 3, 1992, winning re-election to another term.

Maryland 

Incumbent Democrat Barbara Mikulski won re-election to a second term over Republican Alan Keyes, former Assistant Secretary of State for International Organization Affairs.

Missouri 

Incumbent Republican Kit Bond won re-election to a second term over Democratic St. Louis County Councilwoman Geri Rothman-Serot.

Nevada 

Although nearly 10% of the electorate voted for neither of the two major U.S. political parties, incumbent Democrat Harry Reid ultimately beat Republican cattle rancher and President of Nevada Cattlemen's Association Demar Dahl.

New Hampshire 

Incumbent Republican Warren Rudman decided to retire. Republican Governor Judd Gregg won the open seat, beating Democrat John Rauh, former CEO of Griffon Corporation.

New York 

Incumbent Republican Al D'Amato won re-election to a third term over Democrat Robert Abrams, New York State Attorney General and former Borough president of the Bronx. , this was the last Senate election in New York won by a Republican.

Early in the campaign, environmentalist attorney, Laurance S. Rockefeller, Jr. nephew of the former governor Nelson, tried to challenge D'Amato in the Republican primary, but fell short of the required signatures to get onto the primary ballot. D'Amato summarily went unchallenged.

The Democratic primary campaign featured State Attorney General Robert Abrams, former U.S. Congresswoman and 1984 vice presidential candidate Geraldine Ferraro, Reverend Al Sharpton, Congressman Robert J. Mrazek, and New York City Comptroller and former Congresswoman Elizabeth Holtzman.  Abrams was considered the early front-runner.  Ferraro emphasized her career as a teacher, prosecutor, congresswoman, and mother, and talked about how she was tough on crime.  Ferraro drew attacks from the media and her opponents over her husband John Zaccaro's finances and business relationships.

Ferraro became the front-runner, capitalizing on her star power from 1984 and using the campaign attacks against her as an explicitly feminist rallying point for women voters.  As the primary date neared, her lead began to dwindle under the charges, and she released additional tax returns from the 1980s to try to defray the attacks. Holtzman ran a negative ad accusing Ferraro and Zaccaro of taking more than $300,000 in rent in the 1980s from a pornographer with purported ties to organized crime.  The final debates were nasty, and Holtzman in particular constantly attacked Ferraro's integrity and finances.  In an unusual election-eve television broadcast, Ferraro talked about the ethnic slurs made against her as an Italian-American.  In the September 15, 1992 primary, Abrams edged out Ferraro by less than percentage point, winning 37 percent of the vote to 36 percent.  Ferraro did not concede she had lost for two weeks.

After Abrams emerged as the nominee, the Democrats remained divided.  In particular, Abrams spent much of the remainder of the campaign trying to get Ferraro's endorsement. Ferraro, enraged and bitter after the nature of the primary, ignored Abrams and accepted Bill Clinton's request to campaign for his presidential bid instead.  She was eventually persuaded by state party leaders into giving an unenthusiastic endorsement with just three days to go before the general election, in exchange for an apology by Abrams for the tone of the primary.

Abrams was also criticized for calling D'Amato a fascist, and he narrowly lost the general election as a result of these controversies.

North Carolina 

Incumbent Democrat Terry Sanford lost re-election to a second term to Republican Lauch Faircloth, former State Secretary of Commerce.

In 1990, after 40 years as a Democrat, Faircloth switched his party registration and began preparations to seek the Republican Senate nomination in 1992.  Enjoying the support of senator Jesse Helms's political organization, Faircloth defeated Charlotte mayor Sue Myrick and former congressman Walter E. Johnston, III in the primary.  His opponent in the general election was his former ally, Terry Sanford. Although Sanford had helped Faircloth raise money for his failed gubernatorial bid in 1984, he angered Faircloth two years later when he allegedly dismissed Faircloth's chances in a statewide contest if the two ran against each other for the Democratic nomination for the Senate.  Faircloth withdrew from the 1986 race after Sanford "blindsided" him by announcing his candidacy.

Faircloth attacked Sanford as a tax-and-spend liberal, and despite a poor performance in a September televised debate, Faircloth won the seat by a 100,000-vote margin. Sanford may have been weakened by his unpopular vote against authorizing military force in the Persian Gulf War, and he suffered health problems in the summer of 1992.

North Dakota 

Due to the death of Quentin Burdick in September of that year, there were two senate elections in North Dakota.

North Dakota (regular) 

Incumbent North Dakota Democratic NPL Party incumbent Kent Conrad retired, having given a pledge that he would not run for re-election if the federal budget deficit was higher than when he was first elected; however when the other Senate seat became vacant, he ran in the special election. Dem-NPL U.S. Congressman Byron Dorgan won the open seat, beating Republican Steve Sydness, CEO of Endurance International Group.

North Dakota (special) 

The special election was held December 4, 1992 to fill the United States Senate seat vacated by the late Quentin Burdick. Burdick's widow, Jocelyn Burdick, was appointed as a temporary replacement until the election was held. Dem-NPLer Kent Conrad, who held North Dakota's other senate seat for one term since 1986, had not run for re-election to his own seat, holding himself to a campaign promise pledging to reduce the federal deficit. U.S. senator Kent Conrad won the election over Republican State Representative Jack Dalrymple.

Burdick's death provided an opportunity for Conrad to return to the Senate in a fight for an open seat. However, some, particularly his political opponents, saw this as a breach of his promise in spirit if not letter, Conrad's high approval ratings as senator carried through to a victory against Republican state legislator Jack Dalrymple.

Ohio 

Incumbent Democrat John Glenn won re-election to a fourth term, coinciding with Bill Clinton's narrow win during the presidential election. Glenn's voting percentage of 51% over Republican Lieutenant Governor of Ohio Mike DeWine represented the worst performance of his four runs for the Senate, likely due to the presence of third-party candidate Martha Grevatt of the far-left Workers World Party. , this is the last time the Democrats have won the Class 3 Senate Seat from Ohio.

Oklahoma 

Incumbent Republican Don Nickles won re-election to his third term, beating Democratic former State Representative Steve Lewis.

Oregon 

Incumbent Republican Bob Packwood won re-election to his fifth term.

As the election season got underway, analysts from both major parties predicted that Packwood would have one of the toughest seats to defend in what was anticipated to be a volatile election year. Packwood was regarded as one of the nation's "most powerful elected officials" with "extraordinary political instincts." But the state's largest newspaper, The Oregonian, had described AuCoin (Packwood's presumed main challenger) as having "persistence, imagination and clout [that] have made him the most powerful congressman in Oregon and one of the most influential members from the Northwest."

For AuCoin, however, first came the Democratic primary. He faced Portland attorney Joe Wetzel and Bend businessman Harry Lonsdale in what became a "brutal, bitter" contest. Lonsdale, who had run a close race against incumbent Mark Hatfield for Oregon's other Senate seat in 1990, emerged as AuCoin's principal rival; Wetzel, who criticized Packwood and AuCoin as long-term, ineffective members of Congress, trailed throughout the race, and was not invited to an April debate sponsored by the City Club of Portland. Lonsdale took on "the Les AuCoin-Mark Hatfield-Bob Packwood coalition" as his primary cause, stating "I consider Les AuCoin a good man who has been corrupted by PAC money over the years".

In a race the Seattle Times called "as negative as many voters can remember," Lonsdale attacked AuCoin as "corrupt" and tied to the timber industry. Lonsdale's environmental credentials also came under scrutiny, and AuCoin noted Lonsdale's reversal of support for nuclear power and belated opposition to the re-opening of Trojan Nuclear Power Plant. AuCoin turned accusations of undue influence back on Lonsdale, pointing out that his company (Bend Research) had received millions in federal defense contracts.

Even during the primary, Packwood and AuCoin traded barbs on various issues. Packwood joined Lonsdale in criticizing AuCoin for his involvement in what was reported as a rash of check-bouncing among members of Congress; AuCoin characterized the issue as a series of mistakes, rather than gross abuses. In what was believed to be an unprecedented move, Packwood attempted to influence the Democratic primary's outcome by running television ads against AuCoin.

Ultimately, the results of the Democratic primary were so close that an automatic recount was triggered. AuCoin held a news conference on May 23 in the South Park Blocks stating he would wait for the recount, but the margin was currently 248 votes in his favor. On June 18, over a month after the primary election, AuCoin was certified as having won by 330 votes. Upon conceding the race, Lonsdale pondered mounting a write-in campaign, reiterating that Oregon needed an "outsider" in the Senate.

Packwood had gone through a divorce in 1991, and his ex-wife threatened to run against him amid mounting concerns about his "eye for the ladies." The socially conservative Oregon Citizens Alliance (OCA) was at the apex of its statewide prominence with 1992's anti-gay Measure 9 and its newly formed American Heritage Party (AHP). The group endorsed Republican challenger Joe Lutz, who had run against Packwood in the past on a family values platform; but Lutz soon withdrew, announcing a divorce of his own. As early as January, the OCA considered backing former gubernatorial candidate Al Mobley as an independent or as a member of the AHP. Mobley ultimately decided in mid-August not to run, stating that he could not bear the idea that he might be responsible for causing AuCoin to be elected. Packwood's most significant challenge thus came from little-known conservative Medford attorney John DeZell, who campaigned on the family values issue. Packwood cruised to victory over DeZell and several other candidates.

By the end of June, when the recount was complete, AuCoin was nearly out of campaign funds; Packwood entered the general election race with $3.2 million and was ranked sixth nationwide among senators raising funds outside their home state during the 1990–1992 election season.

AuCoin opposed weakening the Endangered Species Act (ESA) to erase the Northern Spotted Owl's impact on the timber industry, but Packwood (“one of the timber industry’s chief allies,” according to Oregon State University political scientist William Lunch) assailed “environmental extremists” and introduced legislation to convene a presidential cabinet committee to exempt the endangered owl from the ESA.

In September, Packwood pulled ads that had falsely criticized AuCoin for missing votes while speaking to special interest groups. By October, Packwood had raised $8 million, spending $5.4 million more than AuCoin, and leading all Senate incumbents. Yet that fall, the two candidates were in a dead heat, with Packwood continuing to criticize AuCoin on attendance, his House bank account and the spotted owl, and AuCoin echoing the campaign of popular Presidential candidate Bill Clinton by accusing Packwood of favoring the wealthy over the middle class.

The outcome of the bruising race was too close to call on election night, but on the following day, Packwood emerged as the winner with about 52% of the vote to AuCoin's 47. In his victory press conference, Packwood endorsed for AuCoin for Secretary of the Interior in the Clinton administration. When told of Packwood's comments, AuCoin responded by saying "I think that's real special."

Pennsylvania 

Incumbent Republican Arlen Specter won re-election to a third term over Democratic millionaire Lynn Yeakel director of women's studies at Drexel University College of Medicine and daughter of former U.S. Congressman Porter Hardy of Virginia (from Montgomery County).

Despite his powerful position in the Senate, Specter had numerous problems entering the election. A moderate who generally received only tepid support from his party's conservative wing, he was criticized by the right for opposing Ronald Reagan's nomination of Robert Bork to the Supreme Court. Specter subsequently faced a primary challenge from an ultra-conservative State Representative named Stephen Freind; although the incumbent won handily, the battle was expensive and featured many damaging attack ads. The senator was also highly targeted by women's groups for his involvement in the Clarence Thomas proceedings; in his questioning of Anita Hill, Specter appeared to show no sympathy for her allegations of sexual harassment. Furthermore, President Bush's popularity was rapidly declining in the state over high unemployment rates and was subsequently dragging down Republican candidates.

Yeakel won the five-way primary with 45% of the vote, easily defeating the endorsed candidate, Lieutenant Governor Mark Singel, in an election cycle dubbed by pundits as the "year of the woman." Polls put her ahead of Specter by double digits. But Specter ran a campaign that was praised by political analysts for being almost flawless. Despite Yeakel's personal wealth, her inexperience in politics led to fund raising problems; in turn, Specter ran television ads long before the Democrat. The moderate Specter portrayed Yeakel, despite her liberal attitude, as a member of an elitist blue-blood family; he emphasized her father's votes against the Civil Rights Act of 1964 while in Congress, her affiliation with an all-white country club, and her church's minister's vocal criticism of the Israeli government.

Despite her mistakes, including a frequent tendency to mispronounce the names of places in which she was campaigning, Yeakel continued to perform solidly, and on Election Day, she captured by large numbers the traditional Democratic strongholds of the state, such as Pittsburgh, Scranton, and Erie. However, Specter undercut Yeakel's support in the state's most critical Democratic county: Philadelphia. Specter campaigned hard in black neighborhoods and received the endorsement of the NAACP. Furthermore, he capitalized on the ambivalence of many Philadelphia Democratic leaders to Yeakel, a self-described reform candidate; as a result, the hugely Democratic city featured a higher than anticipated vote for Specter. Also critical to the campaign was Specter's grassroots involvement in Yeakel's base, the traditionally GOP but Democratic-trending suburbs of Philadelphia.

South Carolina 

Incumbent Democrat Fritz Hollings won re-election to his fifth full term, over Republican former Congressman Thomas Hartnett.

The race between Hollings and Hartnett was between two politicians from the Lowcoutry.  Hartnett attacked Hollings for co-sponsoring a bill in 1983 that would have outlawed discrimination against homosexuals and Hollings shot back about questions of Hartnett's integrity for pushing for military contracts with a firm he had ties with in North Charleston.  The anti-incumbency mood helped to bring Hartnett close to topping Hollings in the general election, but South Carolina voters traditionally support their incumbent politicians and Hollings was elected for another six-year term, albeit with a much reduced margin.

South Dakota 

Incumbent Democrat Tom Daschle won re-election to a second term, beating Republican educator Charlene Haar.

Utah 

Incumbent Republican Jake Garn decided to retire instead of seeking a fourth term. Republican Bob Bennett won the open seat over Democratic congressman Wayne Owens.

Vermont 

Incumbent Democrat Patrick Leahy won re-election to a fourth term, beating Republican Secretary of State of Vermont Jim Douglas.

Washington 

Serving one term, incumbent senator Brock Adams was strongly supportive of his party's leadership. In 1992 he chose not to be a candidate for re-election after eight women made statements to The Seattle Times alleging that Adams had committed various acts of sexual misconduct, ranging from sexual harassment to rape. Adams denied the allegations, but his popularity statewide was weakened considerably by the scandal and he chose to retire rather than risk losing the seat for his party. Chandler seemed to have the upper hand in one of the debates until for some unknown reason he quoted the Roger Miller song "Dang Me." He was further damaged by the unpopularity of President George H.W. Bush in the Pacific Northwest.

Wisconsin 

Incumbent Republican Bob Kasten ran for re-election to a third term, but was defeated by Democratic State senator Russ Feingold.

Feingold, who had little name recognition in the state and was campaigning in a primary against a pair of millionaire opponents, U.S. Congressman Jim Moody and Milwaukee businessman Joe Checota, adopted several proposals to gain the electorate's attention. The most memorable of these was a series of five promises written on Feingold's garage door in the form of a contract. Also noted was Feingold's advertising campaign, which was widely compared to that used by progressive candidate Paul Wellstone in his victorious Senate campaign in Minnesota. Shot in the form of home movies, the ads attempted to portray Feingold, who always referred to himself as "the underdog running for U.S. senate," as a down-to-earth, Capra-esque figure, taking the audience on a guided tour of the candidate's home and introducing them to his children, all of whom were enrolled in public school.

The ads also contained a significant amount of humor. One featured Feingold meeting with an Elvis Presley impersonator, who offered Feingold his endorsement. (Bob Kasten responded to the Elvis endorsement with an advertisement featuring an Elvis impersonator attacking Feingold's record.) Another showed Feingold standing next to a pair of half-sized cardboard cut-outs of his opponents, refusing to "stoop to their level" as the two were shown literally slinging mud at one another.

During the primary campaign, Feingold unveiled an 82-point plan that aimed to eliminate the deficit by the end of his first term. The plan, which called for, among other things, a raise in taxes and cuts in the defense budget, was derided as "extremist" by Republicans and "too liberal" by his Democratic opponents. Feingold also announced his support for strict campaign finance reform and a national health care system and voiced his opposition to term limits and new tax cuts.

Feingold won by positioning himself as a quirky underdog who offered voters an alternative to what was seen by many as negative campaigning of opponents Jim Moody and Joe Checota. On primary day, Feingold, whose support had shown in the single digits throughout much of the campaign, surged to victory with 70 percent of the vote. Seven weeks later, while Bill Clinton, George H. W. Bush, and Ross Perot split the Wisconsin presidential vote 41%-37%-21%, Feingold beat Kasten by a margin of 53 percent to 46 percent.

See also

 1992 United States elections
 1992 United States gubernatorial elections
 1992 United States presidential election
 1992 United States House of Representatives elections
 102nd United States Congress
 103rd United States Congress

Notes

References

Sources